Zerophilia is a 2005 romantic comedy film with speculative-fiction elements directed by Academy of Motion Pictures' Student Academy Award-winning director Martin Curland and produced by Microangelo Entertainment. It is about a young man who discovers that he has a genetic condition which will cause a change of sex following each orgasm. It was filmed in Fall Creek, Oregon.

Plot
"Zerophilia" is a fictional condition that affects an unknown number of people with an extra "Z" chromosome. Following their first full sexual experience, zerophiliacs begin to change sex after experiencing an orgasm. Luke (Taylor Handley), a young man somewhat insecure about his masculinity, begins to exhibit zerophilia following an encounter with a woman (Kelly LeBrock). He meets Michelle (Rebecca Mozo) and experiences partial transformations when they go out together.

He confides with his best friend Keenan (Dustin Seavey) about his partial transformations, who in turn contacts Dr. Sydney Catchadourian (Gina Bellman). Dr. Catchadourian persuades Luke to go through a full transformation. Luke does this by masturbating, becoming female, and subsequently calling herself "Luca". Luca has difficulty achieving an orgasm to change back, even with coaching from Keenan's girlfriend Janine (Alison Folland). However, a visit by Michelle's attractive brother, Max (Kyle Schmid), who flirts with "Luke's cousin", enables her to get sufficiently aroused to complete the transformation back to Luke.

Luke is threatened by his sex transformation, his arousal by an attractive male, and the questions of sexual identity it raises; he seeks help from Sydney. She tells him that a zerophiliac can become "a-morphic" and stop changing sex only by having sex with another zerophiliac... such as herself. He reluctantly agrees to do it, but discovers afterward that she was not telling him the full truth: an a-morphic zerophiliac can still change by having sex with another zerophiliac, and Dr. Catchadourian was using Luke to change herself one last time (into a man), leaving Luca as a woman in the process.

Comic tensions arise from Luke's efforts to keep Michelle at a distance, Max's defensiveness about his sister, Luca's half-hearted resistance to Max's affections, and Luke's confused aggression toward Max. When Michelle discovers that Luke had sex with Dr. Catchadourian, she feels betrayed. Hoping to find Michelle, Luca seeks out Max to profess deep affection for Michelle and remorse for betraying her. Max is touched by the apology, and reveals that he is actually Michelle, also a zerophiliac. They make love repeatedly, changing sex mostly in sync with each other, but occasionally finding themselves the same sex. It ends with the happy couple apparently resolved to their 'condition' and past any questions of their gender and sexual identity.

Cast
 Taylor Handley as Luke
 Dustin Seavey as Keenan
 Alison Folland as Janine
 Kyle Schmid as Max
 Rebecca Mozo as Michelle
 Adam Zolotin as Chad
 Gina Bellman as Dr. Sydney Catchadourian (female)
 Chris Meyer as Jeremy
 Marieh Delfino as Luca
 Kelly Le Brock as Woman in RV
 Rick Stear as Dr. Sydney Catchadourian (male)

Release
The film was released on October 13, 2006, in theaters in North America, and performed poorly at the box office. It was released internationally on cable and DVD in February 2007.

Reception
The film received negative reviews from critics. It has a 25% approval rating on the review aggregator website Rotten Tomatoes, based on 20 reviews. The website's consensus reads, "Zerophilia has some intriguing ideas, but they're imparted with a frustrating lack of wit, daring, or valuable insight."

References

External links
 
 
 REVIEW - New York Times (October 13, 2006, The New York Times)
 REVIEW - Variety (November 6, 2006, Variety)
 REVIEW - Slant Magazine (2006, Slant Magazine)

2005 films
2005 romantic comedy films
Bisexuality-related films
2000s English-language films
American independent films
Films about intersex
2000s science fiction comedy films
Films shot in Oregon
Fictional diseases and disorders
Transgender-related films
American LGBT-related films
2005 LGBT-related films
LGBT-related romantic comedy films
LGBT-related science fiction comedy films
2000s American films